Deepwood House is a historic house at 4697 West Finger Road in Fayetteville, Arkansas. Built about 1960, it was the personal residence of architect Herb Fowler. The property includes the main house, a guest house, and several outbuildings, all designed by Fowler and built by 1965. The main house features a broad expanse of south-facing windows, and a sunken garden just to its west. It and the nearby guest house have gable-on-hip roofs, with extended eaves providing additional shade.

The house was the home of Fowler and his wife Marie (Judy) for 35 years, until they sold the property in 1995.  Herb Keatinge Fowler (1921-April 10, 2008) was born in Lewiston, Idaho.  He attended Yale University before and after serving in the U.S. Army during World War II.  He was a founding member of, and long served, the architecture department at the University of Arkansas in Fayetteville.

The house was listed on the National Register of Historic Places in 2018.

See also
National Register of Historic Places listings in Washington County, Arkansas

References

Houses on the National Register of Historic Places in Arkansas
Houses completed in 1960
Houses in Fayetteville, Arkansas
National Register of Historic Places in Fayetteville, Arkansas